Bodyguard is a 2012 Indian Telugu-language romantic comedy action film produced by Bellamkonda Suresh under the Sri Sai Ganesh Productions banner and directed by Gopichand Malineni. The film stars Venkatesh and Trisha, with music composed by S. Thaman. It is a remake of the 2010 Malayalam film of the same name. 

The film was released on 14 January 2012.

Plot 
Venkatadri (Venkatesh) is a tough bodyguard who is assigned to protect the family of Varadarajula Naidu (Prakash Raj). Keerthi (Trisha) is the college-going daughter of Naidu and Venkatadri accompanies her to the college to keep a watch. Fed up with the close scrutiny maintained by Venkatadri, Keerthi hatches a plan with her friend Swathi (Saloni Aswani) to divert Venkatadri's attention. Keerthi tries to get away from Venkatedri by calling him from a private number. Venkatadri falls in love with the girl without knowing that it is Keerthi herself. At one point, Keerthi too feels herself becoming attracted to Venkatadri and expresses her desire to meet him in person. She tells Venkatadri to meet at a railway station and elope with her. Venkatadri agrees, unaware it is Keerthi.

Naidu comes to think that Venkatadri and Keerthi are going to run away. In order to save Venkatadri from Naidu's anger, Keerthi lies that Venkatadri is meeting another girl at the train station. Naidu lets Venkatadri leave as he is desperate but tells his henchmen to kill Venkatadri if a girl does not come there at the station (which implies that Keerthi loves Venkatadri). Terrified, Keerthi sends Swathi to the station and tells her to tell Venkatadri that she is the lover and that she won't be able to make it to the station. Swathi, seeing Venkatadri, falls in love after all that has happened, and pretends that she is the lover. Keerthi calls her, but Swathi throws the cell phone away, hoping to erase Keerthi from his life completely.

Many years later, after Venkatadri and Swathi's marriage, they have a son. Swathi passes away shortly after. However, before her death, she leaves a diary for her son that outlines the whole story between the phone calls of Venkatadri and Keerthi and their love. The son later goes to Keerthi's house with Venkatadri to visit an elderly Naidu. Venkatadri is shocked that Keerthi has remained unmarried. The son asks Keerthi to come with him and become his mother and Venkatadri is angry at his son for saying something so blunt and rude. But Naidu begs Venkatadri to take Keerthi as his wife. So they go on to the train together but the son runs away before leaving and throws the diary into a trashcan nearby. Venkatadri finds the diary and realizes soon that his real lover, the girl who had waited for him for so many years faithfully, was Keerthi. He calls Keerthi on her cell phone and addresses her as Bangaram. Keerthi is overwhelmed with joy and happiness, realizing that Venkatadri has come to know the truth and her identity. She runs toward Venkatadri and they both hug each other while his son is happily watching them.

Cast 

 Venkatesh as Venkatadri / Venky
 Trisha as Keerthi
 Saloni Aswani as Swathi
 Prakash Raj as Varadarajula Naidu
 Kota Srinivasa Rao as Siva Reddy
 Jaya Prakash Reddy as College Principal
 Subbaraju as Shankaram
 Tanikella Bharani as Mohan Rao
 Ali as Bapatla
 Pragathi as Keerthi's mother
 Dharmavarapu Subramanyam as Subrahmanyam
 M. S. Narayana as Economics Lecturer
 Venu Madhav as Cash Reddy
 Praveen as Cash Reddy's friend
 Thagubothu Ramesh
 Gundu Sudarshan
 Amit Tiwari
 Adarsh Balakrishna
 Fish Venkat
 Raghu Karumanchi as Cash Reddy's friend
 Sana as Venkatadri's mother
 Ping Pong Surya as Cash Reddy's friend
 Bharat
 Sravan
 Ambati Srinivas
 Lahari
 Bhavani
 Rani
 Master Athulith
 Meenakshi Dixit (guest appearance)

Soundtrack 

Music was composed by S. Thaman. Music was released on ADITYA Music Company. The music was launched on 13 December 2011 at Shilpakala Vedika.

Production 
After finalising on the remake, producer Bellamkonda Suresh and actor Venkatesh approached Siddique, the director of the original Malayalam version to direct the Telugu version. He declined the offer, feeling that after remaking the Malayalam original in Tamil (as Kaavalan) and Hindi (under the same title), "another time would be an overkill for me". Later, Gopichand Malineni was chosen as the director. The first look of the film was revealed in August 2011 through a poster. Soon after action scenes were shot at an aluminium factory at Gachibowli in Hyderabad.

Reception 
Bodyguard received generally positive reviews from critics. Hindustan Times rated it 3 out of 5, calling it a "perfect family entertainer". SuperGoodMovies.com predicted that it will do well at the box office "as it has the right mix of commercial elements for the festive audience", rating it 3 out of 5.

Film critic Hemanth Kumar of Postnoon also said that Bodyguard comes with a good package of comedy, drama and romance, and that you could watch it if you haven't watched the original. fullhyd.com's Deepa Garimella rated the film 7/10, calling it "a film with the right ingredients in the right mix". Cinegoer.com's Y Sunita Chowdary also recommended the film, noting that "Venky's films don't make noise but move silently stealthily towards the goal".

Awards

References 

2010s Telugu-language films
2012 action comedy films
2012 films
2012 romantic comedy films
Films about bodyguards
Films directed by Gopichand Malineni
Films scored by Thaman S
Indian action comedy films
Indian romantic comedy films
Telugu remakes of Malayalam films